John Dugmore (born 6 December 1950) is a South African cricketer. He played in one first-class match for Eastern Province in 1974/75.

See also
 List of Eastern Province representative cricketers

References

External links
 

1950 births
Living people
South African cricketers
Eastern Province cricketers